This is a bibliography of the Ebola virus disease, also known as Ebola hemorrhagic fever, a viral hemorrhagic fever of humans and other primates caused by ebolaviruses.

It includes non-fiction works relating to the background and history of the disease, general works, memoirs of those involved in outbreaks such as health workers, works about the effects on particular groups of individuals, and a link to the World Health Organization list of publications about Ebola.

Background and history
 Pattyn S., et al "Isolation of Marburg-like virus from a case of haemorrhagic fever in Zaire", The Lancet, 1977 Mar 12;1(8011):573-4.
 Quammen, David. (2014) Ebola: The Natural and Human History. Bodley Head, London, 2014.

General
 Abdullah, Ibrahim & Ismail Rashid (Eds.) (2017) Understanding West Africa's Ebola Epidemic: Towards a Political Economy. Zed Books. 
 Crawford, Dorothy H. (2016) Ebola: Profile of a Killer Virus. Oxford: Oxford University Press. 
 Evans, Nicholas G. et al (Eds.) (2016) Ebola's Message: Public Health and Medicine in the Twenty-First Century. MIT Press. 
 Farmer, Paul (2020) Fevers, Feuds, and Diamonds: Ebola and the Ravages of History. Farrar, Straus and Giroux. ISBN 978-0374234324
 Hewlett, Barry S. & Bonnie L. Hewlett. (2008) Ebola, Culture and Politics: The Anthropology of an Emerging Disease. 
 Hofman, Michiel & Sokhieng Au (Eds.) (2017) The Politics of Fear: Médecins sans Frontières and the West African Ebola Epidemic. New York: Oxford University Press. 
 Preston, Richard. (1994) The Hot Zone. Anchor.
 Richards, Paul. (2016) Ebola: How a People's Science Helped End an Epidemic. Zed Books. 
 Smith, Tara C. (2005) Ebola. Chelsea House Publications.

Memoirs
 Brantly, Kent. (2015) Called for Life: How Loving Our Neighbor Led us into the Heart of the Ebola Epidemic.  Colorado Springs: WaterBrook Press. 
 Bullard, Stephan Gregory. (2018) A Day-by-Day Chronicle of the 2013-2016 Ebola Outbreak. Springer.  
 Hatch, Steven. (2017) Inferno: A Doctor’s Ebola Story. St. Martin's Press. 
 Lai, Kwan Kew. (2018) Lest We Forget: A Doctor’s Experience with Life and Death During the Ebola Outbreak. Viva Editions.
 Spencer, C. "Having and Fighting Ebola — Public Health Lessons from a Clinician Turned Patient", New England Journal of Medicine, 372 (12): 1089–91. doi:10.1056/NEJMp1501355. .
 Walsh, Sinead & Oliver Johnson. (2018) Getting to Zero: A Doctor and a Diplomat on the Ebola Frontline. Zed Books.

Maternal health
 Bebell, Lisa M. et al "Ebola Virus Disease and Pregnancy: A Review of the Current Knowledge of Ebola Virus Pathogenesis, Maternal, and Neonatal Outcomes", Birth Defects Research, 2017 Mar 15; 109(5): 353–362. doi: 10.1002/bdra.23558
 Schwartz, David A. et al (Ed.) (2019) Pregnant in the Time of Ebola: Women and Their Children in the 2013-2015 West African Epidemic. Springer.

World Health Organization publications
Full list here.

References

Ebola
Bibliographies of medicine